CONSELF is a computer-aided engineering (CAE) platform used by engineers for design purposes. The platform, which highly relies on cloud computing, is developed by CONSELF SRL since its first release in October 2015. In March 2016 a new release of the platform defined guided workflows for the users with focus on turbomachinery, fire scenarios and flows with dispersed solid particles.
Through the platform it is possible to run both Computational Fluid Dynamics and Finite Element Analysis. Among the solvers and libraries used by CONSELF platform, a number of open-source technologies are included, such as:

 FEA: Code_Aster
 CFD:  OpenFOAM

The accuracy of the application is guaranteed by a close cooperation with Italian universities and production of academic papers and research studies. Because of its level of innovation and thanks to the high number of industrial applications, the platform has been rewarded in Italy by national industrial association CONFINDUSTRIA.

Features 

The simulation platform is currently capable of running both CFD and FEA simulations, using hardware resources provided on a pay-per-use basis. Going into the details of the simulation capabilities and, considering the two major operative fields, CONSELF gives the following features:

 Mesh generation
 Tetrahedral and hexahedral meshing algorithms
 Boundary layer definition for CFD analysis
 Finite Element Analysis solvers
 Single body simulation
 Static analysis
 Modal analysis
 Isotropic linear elastic material model
 Geometrical non-linear behaviour (large-displacements)
 Computational Fluid Dynamics solvers
 Incompressible/Compressible single material flow
 Multiphase non compressible flows
 Passive scalar transport for HVAC
 Single Reference Frame (SRF) simulation for Turbomachinery
 Flow with particles

File format 
CONSELF is currently able to interact with a number of 3D modelling generated file formats such as: STEP, IGES, STL formats. In addition, the geometry can be directly imported from their partner CAD platform, namely Onshape.
As output files CONSELF is 100% compatible with opensource viewer ParaView.

References 

Cloud platforms
Computer-aided engineering software for Linux
Computer-aided engineering software
Finite element software
Simulation software